{{DISPLAYTITLE:C28H32O8}}
The molecular formula C28H32O8 (molar mass: 496.55 g/mol, exact mass: 496.2097 u) may refer to:

 Arisugacin A
 Bisvertinolone
 Trichodimerol

Molecular formulas